Michael S. Sanchez (born August 3, 1950) is an American attorney and politician who served in the New Mexico Senate from 1993 to 2016, representing the 29th District (Valencia and Bernalillo Counties). He was defeated in his bid for re-election in 2016.

Early life and education
Sanchez was born in Belen, New Mexico to Gil and Priscilla Sanchez. He is the youngest of four children, including Raymond G. Sanchez, an attorney who served in the New Mexico House of Representatives. Sanchez attended Belen High School and moved to Clarinda, Iowa to attend Iowa Western Community College, where he played baseball and basketball. Sanchez finished school at University of New Mexico. Sanchez then earned a Juris Doctor from the University of New Mexico School of Law.

Career
After graduating from law school, Sanchez was admitted to the State Bar of New Mexico.

Before serving as a State Senator, Sanchez served as the county chairman of the Democratic Party in Valencia County. Sanchez was first elected to the State Senate in 1992.

During his years of service, Sanchez focused on creating better jobs, education and protecting working families. One of his notable legislative accomplishments was the creation of the New Mexico Lottery Scholarship, which has provided thousands of New Mexico high school students with financial assistance to attend college. The Lottery Scholarship was enacted in 1996.

Sanchez served as the Majority Leader of the New Mexico State Senate.

Personal life
Sanchez married Lynn (Trembly) Sanchez in 1969. They have two sons and a daughter.

References

External links
 Michael S. Sanchez – (D) at New Mexico Legislature
 Michael Sanchez – Biography at Project Vote Smart
 Follow the Money – Michael S Sanchez
 2006 2004 2002 2000 1996 1992 campaign contributions

1950 births
Hispanic and Latino American state legislators in New Mexico
Belen High School alumni
Living people
Democratic Party New Mexico state senators
People from Belen, New Mexico
University of New Mexico School of Law alumni
University of New Mexico alumni
Iowa Western Community College alumni
21st-century American politicians